Rose Ella Warner was an American entomologist (more specifically a coleopterist) that worked at the Systematic Entomology Laboratory, United States Department of Agriculture where she researched beetles.

References

American entomologists
Women entomologists
Smithsonian Institution people
Living people
Year of birth missing (living people)